This is a list of princess-abbesses of Quedlinburg Abbey.

Lists of monarchs
Lists of female office-holders
Lists of clerics
Lists of European people
Quedlinburg